Jim Collins (born August 13, 1951) is a Canadian former professional ice hockey player. He was selected by the St. Louis Blues in the 8th round (108th overall) of the 1971 NHL Amateur Draft.

Collins played major junior hockey with the Flin Flon Bombers of the Western Canada Hockey League. In 1971 Collins was drafted by the St. Louis Blues. He went on to play 130 games in the International Hockey League, mostly with the Toledo Hornets.

References

External links

1951 births
Living people
Canadian ice hockey left wingers
Columbus Golden Seals players
Flin Flon Bombers players
Ice hockey people from Manitoba
People from Thompson, Manitoba
St. Louis Blues draft picks
Toledo Hornets players